The women's road race of the 2006 UCI Road World Championships cycling event took place on 23 September in Salzburg, Austria. The race was 132.6 km long.

Anne Samplonius (Canada) and Natalia Boyarskaya (Russia) made an early break, attacking on the climb on the second lap, they held a small gap until two laps to go. Nicole Cooke (Great Britain) attacked up the steep Gschaiderberg climb on the penultimate lap, this caused huge splits in the main field. Several others riders eventually joined Cooke to form a breakaway group which included the Swiss riders Nicole Brändli, Priska Doppmann and Annette Beutler; German riders Judith Arndt, Theresa Senff and Trixi Worrack; Andrea Graus and Christiane Soeder of Austria, Svetlana Bubnenkova (Russia), Oenone Wood (Australia) and Amber Neben (United States) and Marianne Vos (The Netherlands). Vos, Cooke and Brändli attacked several times during the final lap, but the race finished with Vos taking the victory in a small bunch sprint.

Final classification

Did not finish
41 riders failed to finish the race. Giusepina Grassi Herrera of Mexico did not start the race.

References

External links
 Salzburg 2006 home page

See also
 2006 World University Cycling Championship – Women's road race

Women's Road Race
UCI Road World Championships – Women's road race
Cycle races in Austria
2006 in women's road cycling